Mbabaram (Babaram) may refer to:

Mbabaram people, an Australian ethnic group
Mbabaram language, an extinct language of Australia

See also 
 Bambara (disambiguation)

Language and nationality disambiguation pages